Long Island is an island in Langstone Harbour in Hampshire, England. Three Bronze Age pots have been found on the island as has Mesolithic and late neolithic flint-work. Bronze Age pottery along with smaller amounts of Romano-British pottery have been found on the island.

In 1978 the island along with the other islands in Langstone harbour was acquired by the Royal Society for the Protection of Birds who turned it into a bird sanctuary. Since that time unauthorised landings have been forbidden.

References

Uninhabited islands of England
Islands of Hampshire
Borough of Havant